Chiyu Banking Corporation Limited also known as Chiyu Bank is a bank incorporated in Hong Kong.

History 

It was founded by Tan Kah Kee on 15 July 1947, and it has 23 branches in Hong Kong and focuses on serving the community of Fujianese people in Hong Kong.

Chiyu was explicitly created by Chen to create a sustainable business with profits to be devoted to education in Xiamen and the rest of Fujian province in China. Since its founding, it has spent more than HK$1 billion in education in the province, primarily through funding Jimei University and its related schools.

Ownership
Bank of China (Hong Kong) gradually accumulated a 70% stake in Chiyu in the 1970s; the rest of the bank is held by the Jimei University foundation, the government of Xiamen Municipality City and minority shareholders.

On 27 March 2017, Bank of China (Hong Kong) disposed of all of its 70.49% of interests in Chiyu., selling most of it to Xiamen International Investment Limited, a wholly owned subsidiary of Xiamen International Bank Co. Ltd, and part of it (6.18% of Chiyu) to the Committee of Jimei Schools.

References

External links

Banks of Hong Kong
Banks established in 1947
Bank of China
1947 establishments in Hong Kong